Biard is a commune in the Vienne department in the Nouvelle-Aquitaine region in western France, in the Boivre valley.

A suburb of Poitiers, Biard gives its name to the Poitiers–Biard Airport, located 2 km west of the city.

Local facilities  include a primary school, municipal stadium and the Stade Marcel Guérin, operated by the SNCF for railway workers.

Population

See also
Communes of the Vienne department

References

External links

Grottes de Biard

Communes of Vienne